The Northern river reversal or  Siberian river reversal was an ambitious project to divert the flow of the Northern rivers in the Soviet Union, which "uselessly" drain into the Arctic Ocean, southwards towards the populated agricultural areas of Central Asia, which lack water.

Research and planning work on the project started in the 1930s and was carried out on a large scale in the 1960s through the early 1980s. The controversial project was abandoned in 1986, primarily for environmental reasons, without much actual construction work ever done.

Development of the river rerouting projects

The project to turn Siberian rivers goes back to the 1830s, when tsarist surveyor Alexander Shrenk proposed it when the big canal engineering projects were conceived (i.e. the Suez and Panama canals).

The project of turning some of the flow of the northern rivers to the south was discussed, on a smaller scale, in the 1930s. In November 1933, a special conference of the USSR Academy of Sciences approved a plan for a "reconstruction of the Volga and its basin", which included the diversion into the Volga of some of the waters of the Pechora and the Northern Dvina – two rivers in the north of European Russia that flow into the seas of the Arctic Ocean. Research in that direction was then conducted by the Hydroproject, the dam and canal institute led by Sergey Yakovlevich Zhuk. Some design plans were developed by Zhuk's institute, but without much publicity or actual construction work.

In January 1961, several years after Zhuk's death, Nikita Khrushchev presented a memo by Zhuk and another engineer, G. Russo, about the river rerouting plan to the Central Committee of the CPSU. Despite the ousting of Khrushchev in 1964, talks about the projects of turning the major rivers Pechora, Tobol, Ishim, Irtysh, and Ob resumed in the late 1960s.

About 120 institutes and agencies participated in the impact study coordinated by the Academy of Sciences; a dozen conferences were held on the matter. The promoters of the project claimed that extra food production due to the availability of Siberian water for irrigation in Central Asia could provide food for about 200,000,000 people.

The plans involved not only irrigation, but also the replenishing of the shrinking Aral Sea and Caspian Sea.

In the 1970s construction started to divert the Pechora River through the Kama River toward the Volga and the Caspian Sea in the south-west of Russia. However, no further construction work, nuclear or otherwise, was conducted on that canal.

It was estimated that 250 more nuclear detonations would have been required to complete the levelling for the channel if the procedure had been continued. Pollution on the surface was found to be manageable. In the US, expert opinion was divided with some endorsing this project. The physicist Glenn Werth, of the University of California's Lawrence Livermore Laboratory, stated that it was "both safe and economical". Others feared climatic cooling from reduced river water flow, while others thought that increased salinity would melt ice and cause warming. Further work on this irrigation canal was soon stopped.

In the 1980s at least 12 of the Arctic Ocean-bound rivers were proposed to be redirected to the south. At that time it was estimated that an additional freeze-up would occur (delaying the spring thaw) and cut the brief northern growing season by two weeks, if 37.8 billion extra cubic meters of water were returned annually to the European side of Russia and 60 billion cubic meters in Siberia. The adverse effect of climatic cooling was greatly feared and contributed much to the opposition at that time, and the scheme was not taken up. Severe problems were feared from the thick ice expected to remain well past winter in the proposed reservoirs.  It was also feared that the prolonged winter weather would cause an increase in spring winds and reduce vital rains. More disturbing, some scientists cautioned that if the Arctic Ocean was not replenished by fresh water, it would get saltier and its freezing point would drop, and the sea ice would begin to melt, possibly starting a global warming trend. Other scientists feared that the opposite might occur: as the flow of warmer fresh water would be reduced, the polar ice might expand. A British climatologist Michael Kelly warned of other consequences: changes in polar winds and currents might reduce rainfall in the regions benefiting from the river redirection.

Criticism of the project and its abandonment 
In 1986 a resolution "On the Cessation of the Work on the Partial Flow Transfer of Northern and Siberian Rivers" was passed by the Political Bureau of the Central Committee of the CPSU, which halted the discussion on this matter for more than a decade. The Soviet Union and then Russia have continued these studies with the other regional powers weighing the costs and benefits of turning Siberia's rivers back to the south and using the redirected water in Russia and Central Asian countries plus neighbouring regions of China for agriculture, household and industrial use, and perhaps also for rehabilitating water inflow to the Aral Sea.

According to Alexey Yablokov, President of the NGO Centre for Russian Environmental Policy, 5–7% redirection of the Ob's water could lead to long-lasting changes in the climate of the Arctic and elsewhere in Russia, and he opposes these changes to the environment affected by Siberian water redirections to the south. Despite the increase in Siberian rainfall, the redirection has become highly politicised, and Yaroslav Ishutin, director of the Altai Krai Regional Department of Natural Resources and the Environment, claims that the Ob has no water to spare and that Siberia's water resources are threatened.

Calls for resumption of the project 
In the early 21st century interest on this Siberian "water return" project was again resumed and the Central Asian states (President Nursultan Nazarbayev of Kazakhstan, President Islam Karimov of Uzbekistan as well as the Presidents of Kyrgyzstan and Tajikistan) held an informal summit with Russia and China to discuss the project. These proposals met with an enthusiastic response from one of Russia's most influential politicians at the time, Moscow mayor Yury Luzhkov.

See also
Water export
Coastal reservoir
Chicago River reversal
Great construction projects of communism, other ambitious Soviet projects
Great Plan for the Transformation of Nature
Indian Rivers Inter-link – commonly known as the Garland Canal project; a proposed project that aims to connect the perennial rivers of northern India with the seasonally-dry rivers of southern India; for the purposes of water supply and flood control.
Irtysh–Karamay–Ürümqi Canal
North American Water and Power Alliance
South–North Water Transfer Project

References

Canals in Kazakhstan
Canals in Russia
Cancelled projects
Economy of Siberia
Economy of the Soviet Union
Abandoned interbasin transfer
Irrigation in Russia
Irrigation in Kazakhstan
Proposed canals
Proposals in the Soviet Union